Colin Grant may refer to:

 Colin Grant (author) (born 1961), British author of Jamaican origin
 Colin Grant (bishop) (1832–1889), Scottish clergyman, Roman Catholic Bishop of Aberdeen, 1889
 Colin Grant (footballer) (born 1944), Scottish footballer
 Colin Grant (born 1985), Canadian musician